Sura melanochalcia is a moth of the family Sesiidae. It is known from South Africa.

References

Sesiidae
Moths of Sub-Saharan Africa
Lepidoptera of Mozambique
Lepidoptera of Zimbabwe
Moths described in 1917